Korinna Moon Bloodgood (born September 20, 1975) is an American actress and model, known for her role as Lt. Blair Williams in the 2009 film Terminator Salvation and as Anne Glass in the TNT television series Falling Skies.

Early life
Bloodgood was born in Alliance, Nebraska, on September 20, 1975, but was raised in Anaheim, California. Her father, Shell Bloodgood, is American, and her mother, Sang Cha, is Korean. Her father was stationed in South Korea, where he met her mother.

Career

At age 17, Bloodgood became one of the Laker Girls.

In 2005, she was ranked No. 99 on Maxim's magazine's Hot 100 list. She subsequently ranked No. 53 in 2006, No. 40 in 2007 and No. 20 in 2009.

In Day Break (2006–2007), she portrayed Rita Shelten, the girlfriend of a detective who is framed for murder and arrested in the span of a day, but continually finds himself reliving that same day. In 2007, Bloodgood starred as Livia Beale in the American science-fiction television series Journeyman on NBC.

She had a role in the movie Street Fighter: The Legend of Chun-Li, which opened in February 2009. She starred as Blair Williams in Terminator Salvation, the fourth film in the Terminator series and reprised her role in the video game and the animated prequel web series, Terminator Salvation: The Machinima Series.

In early 2009, she joined the third season of the show Burn Notice in a recurring role as Detective Michelle Paxson.

From 2011 to 2015, she portrayed Dr. Anne Glass in TNT's science fiction series Falling Skies executive produced by Steven Spielberg. At the Sundance Film Festival in 2012, Bloodgood won the "Special Jury Prize" for dramatic ensemble acting in The Sessions together with John Hawkes, Helen Hunt, and William H. Macy.

She also voice acts the role of Uriel the Archangel in the video game Darksiders.

In 2017 she was added as a series regular to the third season of the medical drama Code Black.

Personal life
In August 2011, Bloodgood married Grady Hall, who owns an internet company. In December 2012, Bloodgood gave birth to their daughter.

Filmography

Film

Television

Video games

References

External links

 
 

1975 births
Living people
Actresses from California
American film actresses
American television actresses
American video game actresses
American voice actresses
Actresses from Anaheim, California
People from Alliance, Nebraska
20th-century American actresses
21st-century American actresses
National Basketball Association cheerleaders
American cheerleaders
American people of South Korean descent
American actresses of Korean descent
American models of Korean descent
Female models from California
Female models from Nebraska